Daisy Bank railway station was a station built by the Oxford, Worcester and Wolverhampton Railway in 1854 as Daisy Bank & Bradley station. It was situated on the Oxford-Worcester-Wolverhampton Line. The station closed in 1917 as a wartime economy measure before reopening in 1919, and closed permanently in 1962, though goods trains continued to pass through the site until the line closed completely on 22 September 1968.

The cutting from the station site has since been filled in and is now a nature walk with the other side of the line still being in situ as a footpath until a large shrub has been placed to block off the trackbed towards Bilston West.

References

Further reading

Disused railway stations in Wolverhampton
Railway stations in Great Britain opened in 1854
Railway stations in Great Britain closed in 1917
Railway stations in Great Britain opened in 1919
Railway stations in Great Britain closed in 1962
Former Great Western Railway stations
1854 establishments in England